Andropolia is a genus of moths of the family Noctuidae.

Species
 Andropolia aedon (Grote, 1880)
 Andropolia contacta (Walker, 1856)
 Andropolia diversilineata (Grote, 1877)
 Andropolia extincta (Smith, 1900)
 Andropolia olga Smith, 1911
 Andropolia olorina (Grote, 1876)
 Andropolia theodori (Grote, 1878)

Former species
 Andropolia dispar is now Fishia dispar (Smith, 1900)
 Andropolia lichena is now Aseptis lichena (Barnes & McDunnough, 1912)
 Andropolia pallifera is now Apamea pallifera (Grote, 1877)

References
 Andropolia at Markku Savela's Lepidoptera and Some Other Life Forms
 Natural History Museum Lepidoptera genus database

Acronictinae
Noctuoidea genera